The 1989 UEFA European Under-16 Championship was the seventh edition of UEFA's European Under-16 Football Championship. Denmark hosted the championship, during 4–14 May 1989. 16 teams entered the competition, and Portugal won their first title.

Participants

Results

First stage

Group A

Group B

Group C

Group D

Semi-finals

Third place match

Final

References

RSSSF.com
UEFA.com

1989
UEFA
1989 in Danish football
1989
May 1989 sports events in Europe
1989 in youth association football